Aghalurcher was a pre-Norman monastery located east of the shore of upper Lough Erne, County Fermanagh, Northern Ireland, founded according to legend by Saint Ronan in the sixth to early seventh century and dedicated to him in the ninth century.  The site includes the ruins of a medieval church with a small gated vault (locked) — where sculptural fragments are stored — and a gateway constructed with stones from the church. The church was remodelled in 1447 with a new roof added. The site seems to have been abandoned after a murder on the altar effectively deconsecrated the church.

The site includes some interesting gravestones of the late eighteenth century, plus an early medieval carved head on the gateway. Additional sculptural fragments from the site are at the Fermanagh County Museum at Enniskillen Castle.

Saints associated with Aghalurcher Monastery
 Saint Ronan
 Saint Feidhlimidh (Saint Felim)

References

Christian monasteries in Northern Ireland
Buildings and structures in County Fermanagh